is a retired male long-distance runner from Japan. His personal best at the marathon distance was 2:10:30 at the 1983 Fukuoka Marathon.

Competition record

See also
List of 5000 metres national champions (men)

References

1952 births
Living people
Japanese male long-distance runners
Japanese male marathon runners
Asian Athletics Championships winners
Japan Championships in Athletics winners